The Austrian Regional League East is a third-tier division of Austrian football re-introduced in the 1984–85 season. It covers the Austrian states of Burgenland, Lower Austria and Vienna and is one of three leagues at this level.

Recent league champions 
The most recent league champions:

2021–22 member clubs 

 Admira Juniors
 ASK-BSC Bruck/Leitha
 ASV Draßburg
 SV Leobendorf
 FC Marchfeld Mannsdorf-Großenzersdorf
 FC Mauerwerk
 SC Neusiedl am See 1919
 SV Stripfing
 TWL Elektra
 FCM Traiskirchen
 Wiener SK
 SC Wiener Neustadt
 SC Wiener Viktoria
 First Vienna

References

External links
Regional League East 
Austrian Regional League East tables & results at soccerway.com

Eas